Willkaqucha (Quechua willka grandchild / great-grandson / lineage / minor god in the Inca culture, an image of the Willkanuta valley worshipped as God / holy, sacred, divine, willka or wilka Anadenanthera colubrina (a tree), qucha lake) hispanicized spelling Vilcacocha) is a lake in Peru. It is  located in the Lima Region, Huaral Province, Andamarca District.

See also 
 Yanawayin Lake

References 

Lakes of Peru
Lakes of Lima Region